Judit Ágoston-Mendelényi (21 January 1937 – 12 May 2013) was a Hungarian fencer. She won a gold medal in the women's team foil event at the 1964 Summer Olympics.

References

External links
 

1937 births
2013 deaths
Hungarian female foil fencers
Olympic fencers of Hungary
Fencers at the 1964 Summer Olympics
Olympic gold medalists for Hungary
Olympic medalists in fencing
Sportspeople from Miskolc
Medalists at the 1964 Summer Olympics
Universiade medalists in fencing
Universiade bronze medalists for Hungary
Medalists at the 1963 Summer Universiade
20th-century Hungarian women